Inside of Emptiness is the sixth studio album by American musician John Frusciante, released on October 26, 2004 on Record Collection, and is the fourth in a series of six releases, issued from June 2004 to February 2005. The album features contributions from Josh Klinghoffer and Omar Rodríguez-López.

Frusciante notes, "It's really powerful, but in a gentle way. There's a soothing quality. It has hard things on it, and even the soft things have a heaviness to them. The song "Scratches" is emotionally heavy to me, even though it's not distorted guitars and bashing drums. There's another song about a couple's baby dying. There's a lot of spontaneity and recklessness and not giving a fuck."

The vinyl edition of the record saw a repressing from Record Collection on December 11, 2012.  These reissued records are 180 gram and come with a download of choice between MP3 and WAV formats of the album.

Track listing

Personnel
John Frusciante – lead and backing vocals, guitar, synthesizer, keyboard, bass ("The World's Edge", "666"), production, design
Josh Klinghoffer – drums, bass, keyboard, backing vocals, guitar ("I'm Around"), guitar solo ("Inside a Break", "Emptiness")
Omar Rodríguez-López – lead guitar ("666")
Ryan Hewitt – engineer, mixing
Kevin Dean – assistant
Bernie Grundman – mastering
Lola Montes – photography
Mike Piscitelli – design
Dave Lee – equipment technician

References

External links
 Inside of Emptiness on Myspace
Fan site
Archive and news source

John Frusciante albums
2004 albums